Christina Nwankwo (née Gabriel; born 30 August 1968), also known professionally as Christy Nwankwo is a Judge in Rivers State, Nigeria. Since 25 April 2016, she is the substantive President of the Rivers State Customary Court of Appeal. From 2015 until her substantive appointment, she served as acting President of the court, taking over from Peter Agumagu.

References

Living people
Rivers State judges appointed by Ezenwo Nyesom Wike
Women judges
1968 births